Lucie Breyne (born 5 October 2000) is a field hockey player from Belgium, who plays as a defender.

Career

Club hockey
In the Belgian Hockey League, Breyne plays club hockey for the Waterloo Ducks.

National teams

Under–18
In 2018, Lucie Breyne was a member of the Belgium U–18 team at the EuroHockey Youth Championship in Santander. At the tournament, Belgium finished in second place, taking home silver.

Under–21
Following her debut for the Under–18 side in 2018, Breyne appeared in the national Under–21 side in 2019. She represented the team at the EuroHockey Junior Championship in Valencia. The team finished fourth, qualifying for the 2021 FIH Junior World Cup.

Red Panthers
Lucie Breyne made her debut for the Belgium 'Red Panthers' in 2018 during a test series against the United States in Lancaster.

In 2019, Breyne appeared for Belgium during the inaugural tournament of the FIH Pro League.

References

External links
 
 

2000 births
Living people
Female field hockey defenders
Belgian female field hockey players